David Alexander Cospatrick Douglas-Home, 15th Earl of Home,  (20 November 1943 – 22 August 2022) was a British banker and hereditary peer. He was a Conservative member of the House of Lords from 1996 until his death in 2022.

Background and education
Home was born in London, the only son of Sir Alec Douglas-Home, the 14th Earl of Home and British prime minister and later Lord Home of the Hirsel, and Elizabeth Alington, daughter of Cyril Alington. He was educated at Ludgrove School, Eton College, and Christ Church, Oxford.

In 1963, the year his father disclaimed his earldom (and became prime minister), David discontinued the use of his courtesy title, Lord Dunglass.

Career
Home succeeded to his father's disclaimed earldom after his death in October 1995. When the hereditary peers of the House of Lords were reduced under the House of Lords Act 1999, he was elected as one of the 92 that were allowed to remain. He sat as a Conservative, having served some time on the Conservative front bench.

Apart from his political career, Lord Home worked in finance. In 1974, he joined Morgan Grenfell and worked in Egypt, Hong Kong, and Thailand. From 1999 to 2013, he was chairman of the private bank Coutts & Co. 

He was also President of the British Association for Shooting and Conservation and Chief of the Name and Arms of Home.

Home was appointed a Knight of the Order of the Thistle (KT) in the 2014 New Year Honours.

Personal life
Lord Home married Jane Margaret Williams-Wynne (born 20 February 1949), of the Williams-Wynn baronet family, in 1972. They had three children:

Lady Iona Katherine Douglas-Home (born 1980), married the Hon. James Thomas Wingfield Hewitt (b. 1979), son and heir of the 9th Viscount Lifford, on 5 April 2008. They have three sons:
Harry Alexander Wyldbore Hewitt (born 9 February 2010)
Rory David Wingfield Hewitt (born 3 February 2012)
Nico James Cospatrick Hewitt (born 15 May 2015)
Lady Mary Elizabeth Douglas-Home (born 1982), married Christopher Gurth Clothier. They have one daughter:
Eira Thursday Clothier (born 5 January 2013)
Seren Clothier
Michael David Alexander Douglas-Home, 16th Earl of Home (born 30 November 1987), married to Sally Underhill

Death
Lord Home died from lung disease at The Hirsel on 22 August 2022, at the age of 78.  He was succeeded in the earldom by his only son, Michael.

Honours and arms

Honours

Arms

Ancestry

References

External links

Clan Home Association – Official website
www.debretts.com

1943 births
2022 deaths
20th-century English businesspeople
21st-century English businesspeople
Alumni of Christ Church, Oxford
Children of prime ministers of the United Kingdom
Commanders of the Order of the British Empire
Commanders of the Royal Victorian Order
Conservative Party (UK) hereditary peers
Deaths from lung disease
Earls of Home
Bankers from London
English expatriates in Egypt
English expatriates in Hong Kong
English expatriates in Thailand
English people of Scottish descent
Knights of the Thistle
People educated at Eton College
People educated at Ludgrove School
Sons of life peers
Hereditary peers elected under the House of Lords Act 1999